Casimir Pulaski High School is a public high school located on 2500 W Oklahoma Ave in Milwaukee, Wisconsin. Casimir Pulaski is part of the Milwaukee Public School system. The school had 1600 students during the 2004–2005 school year.

Pulaski is a large high school located on Milwaukee's south side. The school combines with Milwaukee High School of the Arts and Carmen Southeast High School to create several sports teams including football, basketball, baseball, swimming, wrestling, cross country and track and field.

Namesake
It is named after Casimir Pulaski, a Polish nobleman who came to fight in the Continental Army during the American Revolutionary War. He is credited as the founder of the Continental Army Cavalry.  Recruited in Paris by Benjamin Franklin, for his talent as a horseman and zeal for liberty, Pulaski joined Gen. George Washington's army in 1777 and led a flanking maneuver that saved the Continental Army at the Battle of Brandywine.  In 1778, he volunteered to raise a cavalry unit for the Continental Army. Pulaski created his Cavalry Legion, equipped and armed as lancers and dragoons in the style of his home country and trained to those standards.  Many Continental Army officer spoke highly of the unit's fighting ability. He died after being mortally wounded, leading a charge during the Siege of Savannah, Georgia in 1779.

History
Pulaski High School opened in September 1933, with 457 students and 17 teachers. The following September (1934) the enrollment had increased to 801 students and 26 teachers. By 1936, there were 1,400 students and 50 teachers. Pulaski now numbers about 850 students and shares their campus with Carmen Southeast High School, which is a Milwaukee Public Schools Charter.  Beginning in 2018, Pulaski became IB Middle Years Program certified.

Campus
Casimir Pulaski High School is located at the corner of Oklahoma and 27th in Milwaukee, Wisconsin. Casimir Pulaski High School is a large orange brick art deco high school.

Facts
Total Students (2019): 853
Full-time teachers: 60
Part of the Milwaukee Public School System

Notable alumni
Robert P. Kordus, Wisconsin State Representative
Robert J. Modrzejewski, Medal of Honor
Fred Rehm, professional basketball player
Jameel McKay (born 1992), Forward/center for the Iowa State Cyclones basketball team

References

External links

School's Webpage

High schools in Milwaukee
Public high schools in Wisconsin
Educational institutions established in 1933
1933 establishments in Wisconsin